Galen Hunter, M.D. (January 20, 1802 – August 6, 1872) was an American pharmacist. He founded The Village Apothecary Shop on Sixth Avenue in New York City. Today, as C.O. Bigelow, it is the oldest apothecary–pharmacy in the United States.

Early life 
Hunter was born in Westmore, Vermont, to Jabesh Hunter and Mary Savage. He graduated Dartmouth College in Hanover, New Hampshire, in 1824.

Career 
In 1838, Hunter established The Village Apothecary Shop at 102 Sixth Avenue in New York City. He ran the business until 1863, at which point it was sold to George L. Hooper, a native of Castine, Maine.

He was a member of the Medical Society of the County of New York between 1841 and his death.

Personal life 
On January 27, 1827, in Springfield, Vermont, Hunter married Elizabeth Rosalind Willard (1807–1852), of Burke, Vermont. They had three known children: Dr. William Charles, who was born in 1829; Helen Elizabeth, born in White River Junction, Vermont, on June 6, 1836; and George Olcutt.

Death 
Hunter died on August 6, 1872, aged 70. He is interred in Brooklyn's Cypress Hills Cemetery. He survived his wife by twenty years.

References 

1802 births
1872 deaths
19th-century American physicians
19th-century American businesspeople
People from Vermont
Dartmouth College alumni
American pharmacists